The colors indicate the political party affiliation of each member:

So the statistics of the Government composition are:

Cabinets of Catalonia